The secretary of budget and management  (Filipino: Kalihim ng Pagbabadyet at Pamamahala) is the head of the Department of Budget and Management and is a member of the president's Cabinet.

The current secretary is Amenah Pangandaman.

The department has four undersecretaries and four assistant secretaries.

List

References

External links
DBM History

 
Budget and Management